Desirae Marie Krawczyk (born January 11, 1994) is an American professional tennis player who specialises in doubles.

Krawczyk has a career-high doubles ranking of world No. 10, achieved in July 2022, and has won seven titles on the WTA Tour, including two at the WTA 500 level. Krawczyk is a four-time major champion in mixed doubles, having won the 2021 French and US Opens partnering Joe Salisbury, as well as the 2021 and 2022 Wimbledon Championships alongside Neal Skupski. She was also runner-up at the 2020 French Open in women's doubles, partnering Alexa Guarachi, and the pair were semifinalists at the 2021 US Open.

Professional career

2018: Maiden doubles title and major debut
In July 2018, she won her maiden WTA Tour doubles title at the Swiss Open, partnering with Chilean Guarachi.

2020: First major doubles final
She reached her first major final at the French Open women's doubles event, partnering Alexa Guarachi, and finished runner-up.

2021: Three major titles in mixed doubles
Krawczyk won the mixed-doubles titles at the French Open (her first Grand Slam title), partnering Salisbury, and at Wimbledon, partnering Skupski.

Seeded second, she reached her third mixed-doubles Grand Slam final at the US Open, again with Salisbury. They won the title, defeating Giuliana Olmos and Marcelo Arevalo in the final, in straight sets. She became the first player to win three Grand Slam mixed-doubles titles in a year, since Martina Hingis and Leander Paes in 2015.

2022: Wimbledon mixed doubles title & doubles SF & top 10 debut
At the 2022 Madrid Open, she reached her first WTA 1000 doubles final. Partnering with Demi Schuurs, she lost to Olmos and Gabriela Dabrowski.

At the Wimbledon Championships, she won her second consecutive title at this major in mixed doubles, partnering again with Skupski, and fourth overall. At the same tournament, partnering Danielle Collins, she reached the semifinals for the third time at a major in doubles in her career. She made her top 10 debut in the doubles rankings on 11 July 2022.

Personal life and background
She is of Polish descent on her father's side, and of Filipino descent on her mother's side.

Performance timelines

Only main-draw results in WTA Tour, Grand Slam tournaments, Fed Cup/Billie Jean King Cup and Olympic Games are included in win–loss records.

Doubles
Current through the 2023 BNP Paribas Open.

Mixed doubles

Grand Slam tournament finals

Doubles: 1 (runner-up)

Mixed doubles: 4 (4 titles)

Other significant finals

WTA 1000 finals

Doubles: 1 (runner-up)

WTA career finals

Doubles: 13 (7 titles, 6 runner-ups)

WTA 125 tournament finals

Doubles: 1 (runner-up)

ITF Circuit finals

Doubles: 11 (6 titles, 5 runner–ups)

Notes

References

External links

 
 

1994 births
Living people
American female tennis players
American sportspeople of Filipino descent
American people of Polish descent
Arizona State Sun Devils women's tennis players
Tennis people from California
People from Palm Desert, California
French Open champions
Wimbledon champions
US Open (tennis) champions
Grand Slam (tennis) champions in mixed doubles
21st-century American women